Frank Edward John Rankmore (21 July 1939 – 20 November 2022) was a Welsh professional footballer who played as a defender for Cardiff City, Peterborough United, and Northampton Town. At international level, he made one appearance for the Wales national team.

Career
Rankmore was born in Cardiff and began his league career at Cardiff City after joining the club from local side Cardiff Corinthians in 1957. He was unable to break into the first team, and his early time at Ninian Park was spent mostly in the reserve side. At the end of the 1959–60 season he was placed on the transfer list. However, when Danny Malloy left the club in 1961, Rankmore found himself promoted to the first-team, making 37 league appearances during his first full season but was unable to prevent the club slipping out of Division One. After one more season as a first-team regular, Rankmore found himself out of favour again following the arrival of John Charles from Roma and was sold to Division Three side Peterborough United for a fee of £10,000.

Rankmore went on to appear over 200 times for Peterborough and was awarded his first, and only, cap for Wales when he played against Chile during a tour of South America in 1966. In 1968, he was sold to local rivals Northampton Town for £12,000, becoming the third Peterborough player to move to Northampton in the space of five months after Johnny Byrne and Jack Fairbrother, where he made over 100 appearances before injury forced him into retirement in 1971.

Personal life and death
Rankmore died on 20 November 2022, at the age of 83.

References

External links

1939 births
2022 deaths
Footballers from Cardiff
Welsh footballers
Wales international footballers
Wales under-23 international footballers
Cardiff City F.C. players
Peterborough United F.C. players
Northampton Town F.C. players
English Football League players
Association football defenders